Josip Brekalo (born 23 June 1998) is a Croatian footballer who plays as a winger for Italian  club Fiorentina and the Croatia national team.

Club career 
Brekalo is a youth exponent from Dinamo Zagreb. He made his league debut on 19 December 2015 against Inter Zaprešić. On 15 May 2016 he signed for Bundesliga club VfL Wolfsburg for €10 million.

On 31 January 2017, Brekalo was loaned out to VfB Stuttgart until the end of the season with an option for a further year. The loan deal was initially automatically extended until June 2018 when Stuttgart secured promotion. Brekalo scored his first senior goal on 17 February 2017 coming off the bench for VfB Stuttgart against 1. FC Heidenheim. Brekalo returned prematurely to Wolfsburg on 1 January 2018. On 8 May 2021, he scored his first career hat-trick in a 3–0 victory over Union Berlin.

On 31 August 2021, Brekalo joined Torino on a loan with options to buy.

On 28 January 2023, Brekalo returned to Italy and signed with Fiorentina.

International career 
Brekalo is a youth international and has represented Croatia in 2015 UEFA Under-17 Euro, 2015 FIFA U-17 World Cup, 2016 UEFA Under-19 Euro and 2019 UEFA Under-21 Euro. 

He made his debut for Croatia's senior squad on 15 November 2018 in a 3–2 Nations League victory over Spain. On 8 September 2020, Brekalo scored his first international goal for Croatia in a 4–2 Nations League defeat to France.

On 1 June 2021, Brekalo was named in Croatia's final 26-man squad for the UEFA Euro 2020. On 31 October 2022, he was named in the preliminary 34-man squad for the 2022 FIFA World Cup; however, this time he didn't make the final 26.

Style of play 
He usually plays on the right wing for both club and national team. However, he played some international matches on different positions. In the 2018–19 UEFA Nations League he played as a right back due to absence of Šime Vrsaljko. In 2020–21 UEFA Nations League he was used as one of two false 9 strikers in 4-1-2-1-2 formation, a formation which does not support wingers.

Personal life 
Brekalo's father Ante (nicknamed Šargija) is a former footballer, having represented Bosnia and Herzegovina on various youth levels, as he hails from the Bosnian region of Posavina. His career was halted at the age of 21, when the Yugoslav Wars broke out and he got wounded on the battlefield.

On 2 June 2021, Brekalo and his partner Dominika Kralj became parents of a girl, whom they named Nika. On 17 July, Brekalo and Kralj married in Zagreb.

Controversies 

In summer 2018, Brekalo sparked controversy in German and Croatian media after stating that he would not like to wear a captain's armband with LGBT flag colours, after VfL Wolfsburg decided that captains of all their teams would wear such an armband during the 2018–19 season. The reason for that was cited to be the club's "stance for tolerant society" and "stance against discrimination". After 'liking' homophobic comments under club's Instagram post of captain Josuha Guilavogui wearing the armband, Brekalo blamed it on a mobile phone malfunction in an interview with Kicker. He then went on to state: "I have to say that I can't stand completely behind this action, because it contradicts my Christian belief. I've been raised religiously. I’m fine with people living a different lifestyle, because that's their business. But I don't want and don't have to carry a symbol representing them."

Career statistics

Club

International

Scores and results list Croatia's goal tally first. Score column indicates score after each Brekalo goal.

Honours
Individual
 2015 UEFA European Under-17 Championship Team of the Tournament

References

External links

Profile at the ACF Fiorentina website 

1998 births
Living people
Croatian footballers
Croatia youth international footballers
Croatia under-21 international footballers
Croatia international footballers
Association football forwards
Croatian Football League players
Bundesliga players
2. Bundesliga players
Regionalliga players
Serie A players
GNK Dinamo Zagreb players
VfL Wolfsburg players
VfL Wolfsburg II players
VfB Stuttgart players
GNK Dinamo Zagreb II players
Torino F.C. players
ACF Fiorentina players
UEFA Euro 2020 players
Croatian expatriate footballers
Expatriate footballers in Germany
Expatriate footballers in Italy
Croatian expatriate sportspeople in Germany
Footballers from Zagreb
First Football League (Croatia) players
Croatian Roman Catholics